The 2022 French Open – Men's singles qualifying are a series of tennis matches that takes place from 16 to 20 May 2022 to determine the sixteen qualifiers into the main draw of the 2022 French Open – Men's singles, and, if necessary, the lucky losers.

The losses of Feliciano López and Andreas Seppi in the first round ended their streaks of consecutive appearances in the main draws of Grand Slam singles events at 79 and 66 — the longest and third longest streaks, respectively, in the Open Era.

Seeds

Qualifiers

Lucky losers

Draw

First qualifier

Second qualifier

Third qualifier

Fourth qualifier

Fifth qualifier

Sixth qualifier

Seventh qualifier

Eighth qualifier

Ninth qualifier

Tenth qualifier

Eleventh qualifier

Twelfth qualifier

Thirteenth qualifier

Fourteenth qualifier

Fifteenth qualifier

Sixteenth qualifier

References 
General

Specific
 Qualifying draw
 2022 French Open – Men's draws and results at the ITF

Men's singles qualifying
French Open – Men's singles qualifying
French Open by year – Qualifying